Ion Pârcălab (born 5 November 1941) is a Romanian former football player and manager.

Club career
Ion Pârcălab, nicknamed "The Carpathian Arrow" by foreign experts, started his senior career at UTA Arad, making his Divizia A debut on 24 May 1959 in a 2–1 loss against Jiul Petroșani. In 1961 he went to play for Dinamo București where in his first four seasons spent at the club, he won four consecutive Divizia A titles in the first he contributed with 7 goals scored in 24 matches, in the second he played 21 games and scored 7 goals, in the third he made 25 appearances with 10 goals scored and in the last one he scored 8 goals in 20 matches. He also won two Cupa României in 1964 and 1968, at the first one scoring a goal in the final which ended 5–3 against rivals Steaua București and in 1965, he was awarded the title "Best Football Player" in Romania. Pârcălab's last Divizia A appearance took place on 19 July 1970, playing for Dinamo in a 1–1 against Politehnica Iași, having a total of played 232 matches played in the competition in which he scored 66 goals, also appearing in a total of 20 matches in which he scored 5 goals in European competitions.

Transfer at Nîmes
During Romania's communist era, transfers of Romanian footballers outside the country were rarely allowed, but in June 1970 dictator Nicolae Ceaușescu went on a visit in Nîmes where he was invited by the communist mayor of the town Georges Pompidou. At that meeting they also talked about football and Pompidou complained about the poor results of the local football team, Nîmes Olympique so Ceaușescu told him that he is going to send two Romanian footballers to the club. Some French people were sent to see the 1970 Cupa României final which was won with 2–1 by Steaua București against Dinamo București and they selected Florea Voinea from Steaua București and Pârcălab from Dinamo to come and play for Nîmes Olympique, where in the 1971–72 season they helped the team finish second in the championship, each of them scoring 11 goals.

International career
Ion Pârcălab played 26 games and scored three goals at international level for Romania, making his debut on 8 October 1961 under coach Gheorghe Popescu I in a friendly which ended with a 4–0 victory against Turkey. His following game was a 3–1 victory against Spain at the 1964 European Nations' Cup qualifiers. Pârcălab scored his first goal for the national team in a friendly which ended with a 3–2 victory against East Germany. He played six matches and scored one goal in a 2–0 victory against Eusébio's Portugal at the 1966 World Cup qualifiers. Pârcălab scored his last goal for the national team in a friendly which ended with a 2–1 victory against Israel and made one appearance at the Euro 1968 qualifiers and one at the 1970 World Cup qualifiers. Pârcălab also played 12 games for Romania's Olympic team and participated at the 1964 Summer Olympics in Tokyo where he scored two goals, one in a 3–1 victory against Mexico and one in a 3–0 victory against Yugoslavia, helping the team finish in the 5th place.

International goals
Scores and results list Romania's goal tally first, score column indicates score after each Pârcălab goal.

Conviction
In 1980, Pârcălab was coach at Progresul Pucioasa in the third division. After a victory in the championship, Pârcălab took his players to a restaurant in order to celebrate, but after a few drinks, a conflict between him and the goalkeeper Nicolae Stancu started because of a waitress. They went to the bathroom to solve their problem and it is assumed that there Pârcălab killed Stancu by introducing a broomstick in his throat or by hitting him in the back of his head. Pârcălab was sentenced to three years in prison but got released after two. In the early 2000s, Pârcălab claimed he was innocent and that he was wrongfully convicted.

Personal life
Pârcălab's stepbrother was Nicolae Dumitrescu, who was also an international footballer and a manager.

Honours
Dinamo București
Divizia A: 1961–62, 1962–63, 1963–64, 1964–65
Cupa României: 1963–64, 1967–68
Nîmes Olympique
French Division 1 runner-up: 1971–72
Coppa delle Alpi: 1972

Notes

References

External links

1941 births
Living people
Footballers from Bucharest
Romanian footballers
Association football forwards
Romania international footballers
Olympic footballers of Romania
Footballers at the 1964 Summer Olympics
FC UTA Arad players
FC Dinamo București players
Nîmes Olympique players
Ligue 1 players
Liga I players
Romanian football managers
FC Gloria Buzău managers
Romanian expatriate footballers
Romanian expatriate sportspeople in France
Expatriate footballers in France